Following is a list of Apple IIGS games. While backwards compatible for running most Apple II games, the Apple IIGS has a native 16-bit mode with support for graphics, sound, and animation capabilities that surpass the abilities of the earlier Apple II. The machine is part of the 16-bit home computer gaming revolution of the mid 1980s to early 1990s, competing directly with the Amiga and Atari ST.

There are currently  games on this list. This number is always up to date by this script.

{|class="wikitable sortable"
|-
!Title !! Year !! Developer !! Publisher !! Genre

|- id="0.E2.80.939"
|4th & Inches
|
|Tony Manso & Sculptured Software
|Accolade
|Sports
|-
|Aaargh!
|
|Synergistic Software
|Arcadia Software
|Action
|-
|Airball
|
|Jason Harper
|MicroDeal
|Action/puzzle
|-
|Alien Mind
|
|Rob Karr & Matt Crysdale
|PBI Software
|Action/adventure
|-
|Ancient Glory
|
|Logical Design Works, Westwood Associates
|Big Red Computer Club
|Action
|-
|Ancient Land of Ys
|
|Designer Software
|Kyodai
|Action/RPG
|-
|Antetris
|
|Peter Jensen
|
|Shoot-em-up
|-
|Apple IIgs Karate
|
|Antoine Vignau & Olivier Zardini (Brutal Deluxe)
|
|Fighting
|-
|Arkanoid
|
|Ryan Ridges & John Lund
|Taito America
|Arcade
|-
|Arkanoid II: Revenge of Doh
|
|Ryan Ridges & John Lund
|Taito America
|Arcade
|-
|As the Link Turns
|
|Parik Rao & Scott Pease (Rogue Systems)
|
|Shoot-em-up
|-
|Balance of Power: 1990 Edition
|
|Chris Crawford
|Mindscape
|Simulation
|-
|Bard's Tale, The
|
|Rebecca Heineman
|Electronic Arts
|RPG
|-
|Bard's Tale II: The Destiny Knight, The
|
|Rebecca Heineman
|Electronic Arts
|RPG
|-
|Battle Chess
|
|Rebecca Heineman
|Interplay Productions
|Board game
|-
|Beyond Zork
|
|Brian Moriarty
|Infocom
|Interactive fiction
|-
|Bill Palmer
|
|Antoine Vignau & Olivier Zardini (Brutal Deluxe)
|
|Adventure
|-
|Bille Art
|
|Antoine Vignau & Olivier Zardini (Brutal Deluxe)
|
|Puzzle
|-
|Black Cauldron
|
|Al Lowe
|Sierra
|Adventure
|-
|Blackjack Academy
|
|Westwood
|Micro Illusions
|Card game
|-
|Block Out
|
|Logical Design Works
|California Dreams
|Arcade/puzzle
|-
|Blockade
|
|Antoine Vignau & Olivier Zardini (Brutal Deluxe)
|
|Puzzle
|-
|Boggled
|
|Kenrick Mock (Sound Barrier Systems)
|
|Board game
|-
|Bouncing Bluster
|
|Jean-Francois Doué & Jean-Michel Vallat (Fantasia Entertainment)
|
|Arcade
|-
|Bouncing Bluster II
|
|Jean-Francois Doué & Jean-Michel Vallat
|Toolbox
|Arcade
|-
|Bridge 6.0
|
|Arthur Walsh & Roger Harnish
|Artworx
|Card game
|-
|Bubble Ghost
|
|ERE Informatique
|Accolade
|Action/puzzle
|-
|BuGS
|
|Jeremy Rand
|
|Arcade
|-
|California Games|
|Designer Software (Jimmy Huey)
|Epyx
|Sports
|-
|Canal Meurtre|
|Antoine Vignau & Olivier Zardini (Brutal Deluxe)
|
|Adventure
|-
|Captain Blood|
|ERE Informatique (Alexis Martial & Jean-Michel Jarre)
|Mindscape
|Simulation/adventure
|-
|Carte Primus|
|David Manthey
|
|Card game
|-
|Castle Arms|
|Tom Gooding
|
|
|-
|Catacombs|
|John Carmack & Tom Hall
|Softdisk Publishing
|Action/adventure
|-
|Cavern Cobra|
|Greg Hale
|PBI Software
|Shoot-em-up
|-
|Chessmaster 2100, The Fidelity|
|Troy Heere & Mark Manyen
|Software Toolworks
|Board game
|-
|Club Backgammon|
|Logical Design Works
|California Dreams
|Board game
|-
|Cogito|
|Antoine Vignau & Olivier Zardini (Brutal Deluxe)
|
|Puzzle
|-
|Columns|
|Kenrick Mock (Sound Barrier Systems)
|
|Puzzle/arcade
|-
|Copy Killers|
|Brian Greenstone & Dave Triplett
|Pangea Software
|
|-
|Cosmocade|
|Brian Greenstone, Dave Triplett & Gene Koh
|Pangea Software
|Arcade
|-
|Cribbage King / Gin King|
|Mark Manyen
|Software Toolworks
|Card game
|-
|Cryllan Mission 2088|
|Vinay Pai, Vivek Pai & Vijay Pai
|Victory Software
|RPG
|-
|Cryllan Mission 2088: The Second Scenario|
|Vinay Pai, Vivek Pai & Vijay Pai
|Victory Software
|RPG
|-
|Crystal Quest|
|Rebecca Heineman
|Cassidy & Greene
|Action/arcade
|-
|Dark Castle|
|Lane Roath
|Three Sixty
|Action
|-
|Dark Designs I|
|John Carmack
|Softdisk Publishing
|RPG
|-
|Dark Designs II: Closing the Gate|
|John Carmack
|Softdisk Publishing
|RPG
|-
|Dark Designs III: Retribution!|
|John Carmack
|Softdisk Publishing
|RPG
|-
|Defender of the Crown|
|Manley & Associates
|Cinemaware
|Action/strategy
|-
|Deja Vu: A Nightmare Comes True|
|ICOM Simulations
|Mindscape
|Adventure
|-
|Deja Vu II: Lost in Las Vegas|
|ICOM Simulations
|Mindscape
|Adventure
|-
|Destroyer|
|Michael Kosaka & Chuck Sommerville
|Epyx
|Simulation
|-
|Downhill Challenge|
|Microids
|Broderbund
|Sports
|-
|Dr. Mario|
|Blue Adept (USAlliance)
|
|Puzzle/arcade
|-
|Dragon Wars|
|Rebecca Heineman
|Interplay Productions
|RPG
|-
|Dragon's Lair|
|Antoine Vignau & Olivier Zardini (Brutal Deluxe)
|
|Arcade
|-
|Dragon's Lair: Escape from Singe's Castle|
|Antoine Vignau & Olivier Zardini (Brutal Deluxe)
|
|Arcade
|-
|Dragon's Lair II: Time Warp|
|Antoine Vignau & Olivier Zardini (Brutal Deluxe)
|
|Arcade
|-
|Dragon's Lair III: The Curse of Mordread|
|Antoine Vignau & Olivier Zardini (Brutal Deluxe)
|
|Arcade
|-
|Dream Zone|
|Naughty Dog (Andy Gavin & Jason Rubin)
|Baudville
|Adventure
|-
|DuelTris|
|Steven Chiang, Dave Seah & James Brookes
|DreamWorld
|Puzzle/arcade
|-
|Dungeon Master|
|Don Jordan
|FTL
|RPG
|-
|DuoTris|
|Richard Wifall & James Brookes (GS<>IRC)
|
|Puzzle/arcade
|-
|Egérie, L|
|Antoine Vignau & Olivier Zardini (Brutal Deluxe)
|
|Adventure
|-
|ExplorerGS
|
|Jason Smart
|
|RPG
|-
|F1 Race
|
|Joel Quejada
|
|Racing
|-
|Fast Break
|
|Greg Hospelhorn & George Wong
|Accolade
|Sports
|-
|Final Assault
|
|Infogrammes
|Epyx
|Simulation
|-
|Firepower
|
|Stephen Lepisto
|MicroIllusions
|Action
|-
|Full Metal Planete
|
|Brainstorm Software (Francois Uhrich & Nicolas Bergeret)
|Infogrames
|Turn-based strategy
|-
|Fun Columns
|
|FTA (Olivier Goguel & Olivier Bailly-Maitre)
|Toolbox
|Puzzle/arcade
|-
|Futureshock 3D
|
|Jeff Johnson
|Neeka Electronics
|Action
|-
|GATE
|
|Bright Software (Joerg Kienzle, Yann Le Tensorer & Henrik Gudat)
|Toolbox & Seven Hills Software
|Action/adventure
|-
|Gauntlet
|
|Atari Games
|Mindscape
|Arcade
|-
|GBA Championship Basketball: Two on Two
|
|Gamestar (Paul Terry & Jack Thornton)
|Activision
|Sports
|-
|Gnarly Golf
|
|Visual Concepts (Jim Coliz Jnr & Darren Bartlett)
|Britannica / Fanfare
|Sports
|-
|Gold of the Americas
|
|Stephen Hart, Ian Trout & Allan Bell
|Strategic Studies Group
|Turn-based strategy
|-
|Gold Rush!
|
|Doug & Ken MacNeill
|Sierra
|Adventure
|-
|GS Adventure
|
|Peter Hirschberg
|
|Action/adventure
|-
|GS Asteroids
|
|Peter Hirschberg
|
|Arcade
|-
|GS Invaders
|
|David Ong-Tat-Wee
|
|Arcade
|-
|GS Pac-Man
|
| 	Peter Hirschberg 
|
|Arcade
|-
|GShisen
|
|Kelvin Sherlock
|
|Board game
|-
|Grackle
|
|Brian Greenstone
|Pangea Software
|Shoot-em-up
|-
|Grand Prix Circuit
|
|Distinctive Software Inc
|Accolade
|Racing
|-
|Great Western Shootout
|
|Visual Concepts (Scott Patterson & Matt Crysdale)
|Britannica / Fanfare
|Arcade
|-
|Hacker II: The Doomsday Papers
|
|Steve Cartwright
|Activision
|Real-time strategy
|-
|Halls of Montezuma
|
|Roger Keating & Ian Trout
|Strategic Studies Group
|Turn-based strategy
|-
|HardBall!
|
|Distinctive Software Inc (Dan Thompson)
|Accolade
|Sports
|-
|Hostage
|
|Infogrammes
|Mindscape
|Action/strategy
|-
|Hover Blade
|
|Shiraz Akmal & Eric Boden
|MCX
|Action
|-
|Hunt for Red October
|
|John Brooks, Todd Daugherty & Alex Villagran
|Software Toolworks
|Simulation
|-
|Immortal, The
|
|Sandcastle (Will Harvey, Ian Nitchal & Doug Fulton)
|Electronic Arts
|Action/RPG
|-
|Impossible Mission 2
|
|Novotrade
|Epyx
|Action
|-
|Jack Nicklaus' Greatest 18 Holes of Major Championship Golf
|
|Tony Manso
|Accolade
|Sports
|-
|Jigsaw!
|
|Huibert Aalbers & Javier Rullan Ruano
|Britannica Software
|Puzzle
|-
|John Elway's Quarterback
|
|Shadowmasters Design
|Melbourne House
|Sports
|-
|KABOOM!
|
|Ninjaforce
|
|Action
|-
|Kaleidokubes
|
|Bob & Betsy Couch
|Artworx
|Puzzle
|-
|Keef the Thief
|
|Naughty Dog (Andy Gavin & Jason Rubin)
|Electronic Arts
|RPG
|-
|King of Chicago
|
|Doug Sharp
|Cinemaware
|Action/strategy
|-
|King's Quest: Quest for the Crown
|
|Roberta Williams
|Sierra
|Adventure
|-
|King's Quest II: Romancing the Throne
|
|Roberta Williams
|Sierra
|Adventure
|-
|King's Quest III: To Heir Is Human
|
|Roberta Williams
|Sierra
|Adventure
|-
|King's Quest IV: The Perils of Rosella
|
|Roberta Williams
|Sierra
|Adventure
|-
|LaserForce
|
|European Software Partner
|Britannica / Fanfare
|Action
|-
|Last Ninja, The
|
|System 3
|Activision
|Action/adventure
|-
|Legend of the Star Axe
|
|Heads on the Hills Software (Tom Hall, Kevin Kemmerly & Lane Roath)
|Softdisk Publishing
|Shoot-em-up
|-
|Leisure Suit Larry in the Land of the Lounge Lizards
|
|Al Lowe
|Sierra
|Adventure
|-
|Lemmings
|
|Antoine Vignau & Olivier Zardini (Brutal Deluxe)
|
|Puzzle
|-
|LetterSlide
|
|Kenrick Mock (Sound Barrier Systems)
|
|Board game
|-
|Life & Death
|
|Mark Manyen & Jacob P. Smith
|Software Toolworks
|Simulation
|-
|Lost Treasures of Infocom, The
|
|Mike Howard & John Wrenholt
|Big Red Computer Club
|Interactive fiction
|-
|Lost Tribe, The
|
|Steve Vance, Frank Andrews & Todd Harris
|Lawrence Productions
|Adventure/strategy
|-
|Mad Match
|
|Paul Gauthier
|Baudville
|
|-
|Mancala
|
|Logical Design Works
|California Dreams
|Board game
|-
|Manhunter: New York
|
|Dave, Barry and Dee Dee Murray
|Sierra
|Adventure
|-
|Marble Madness
|
|Will Harvey
|Electronic Arts
|Arcade
|-
|Mazer II
|
|Farfetch Software
|Big Red Computer Club
|Action/RPG
|-
|Mean 18
|
|Mark Lesser & Micro Smiths
|Accolade
|Sports
|-
|Mighty Marvel Vs the Forces of E.V.I.L.
|
|Winchell Chung
|ISM
|RPG
|-
|Milestones 2000
|
|Ken Franklin
|
|Card game
|-
|Mini-Putt
|
|Ross Salas & Tanager Software Productions
|Accolade
|Sports
|-
|Mixed Up Mother Goose
|
|Roberta Williams
|Sierra
|Adventure
|-
|Monte Carlo
|
|Richard Seaborne & Jeff Lefferts
|PBI Software
|Gambling
|-
|Neuromancer
|
|Rebecca Heineman
|Interplay Productions
|Adventure
|-
|Night Driver
|
|Ian Schmidt & Fatdog Projects
|
|Racing
|-
|Omega
|
|Micro Magic
|Origin
|Simulation
|-
|One Arm Battle
|
|Ken Franklin
|
|
|-
|Operation Lambda
|
|Bret Victor (Right Triangle Production)
|
|Action/puzzle
|-
|Orbizone
|
|Brian Greenstone & Dave Triplett
|Pangea Software
|Arcade
|-
|Out of this World (aka Another World)
|
|Rebecca Heineman
|Interplay Productions
|Action/adventure
|-
|Panzer Battles
|
|Roger Keating, Danny Stevens & Ian Trout
|Strategic Studies Group
|Turn-based strategy
|-
|Paperboy
|
|Atari Games
|Mindscape
|Arcade
|-
|Passagers du vent (les)
|
|Antoine Vignau & Olivier Zardini (Brutal Deluxe)
|
|Adventure
|-
|Passagers du vent II (les)
|
|Antoine Vignau & Olivier Zardini (Brutal Deluxe)
|
|Adventure
|-
|Pente
|
|Kenrick Mock (Sound Barrier Systems)
|
|Puzzle
|-
|Pick 'n Pile
|
|Atreid Concept
|Procyon
|Puzzle/arcade
|-
|Pipe Dream
|
|Visual Concepts
|Lucasfilm Games
|Puzzle
|-
|Pirates!
|
|Ed Magnin
|Microprose
|Action/strategy
|-
|Plunder!
|
|Ken Franklin
|
|
|-
|Plotting
|
|Once Product (Philippe Leclercq)
|
|Arcade
|-
|Police Quest
|
|Jim Walls
|Sierra
|Adventure
|-
|Puyo Puyo
|
|Bret Victor (Right Triangle Production)
|
|Arcade/puzzle
|-
|Qix
|
|Ryan Ridges & John Lund
|Taito America
|Arcade
|-
|Quadronome
|
|Brian Greenstone & Dave Triplett
|Pangea Software
|Action
|-
|Quest for the Hoard
|
|Ken Burtch (Pegasoft)
|
|Puzzle
|-
|Quest for the Hoard II: Treasures from Heaven
|
|Ken Burtch (Pegasoft)
|
|Arcade/puzzle
|-
|Questmaster I
|
|Sean Barger
|Miles Computing
|Adventure
|-
|Questron II
|
|Westwood
|Strategic Simulations Inc
|RPG
|-
|Rastan
|
|John Brooks
|Taito America
|Arcade
|-
|Reach for the Stars
|
|Roger Keating & Ian Trout
|Strategic Studies Group
|Turn-based strategy
|-
|Rescue Rover
|
|Rebecca Heinemen & Adrian Carmack
|Softdisk Publishing
|Action/puzzle
|-
|Revolution '76
|
|Edward and Patricia Bever
|Britannica Software
|Turned-based strategy
|-
|Roadwar 2000
|
|Westwood
|Strategic Simulations Inc
|Turn-based strategy
|-
|Rocket Ranger
|
|Ed Magnin
|Cinemaware
|
|-
|Sea Strike
|
|Richard Seaborne & Jeff Lefferts
|PBI Software
|Shoot-em-up
|-
|Secrets of Bharas, The
|
|Vinay Pai, Vivek Pai & Vijay Pai
|Victory Software
|RPG
|-
|Sensei
|
|Phil Rivipellio, Walt Scapela & Neil Pulcadesso (Miami Software)
|
|Fighting
|-
|Senseless Violence 1: Survival of the Fetus
|
|Brian Greenstone & Dave Triplett 
|Pangea Software
|Action
|-
|Senseless Violence 2: You Use, You Die
|
|Brian Greenstone & Gene Koh
|Pangea Software
|Action
|-
|Serve & Volley
|
|Jeffrey Sigler
|Accolade
|Sports
|-
|Shadowgate
|
|ICOM Simulations
|Mindscape
|Adventure
|-
|Shanghai
|
|Manley & Associates (Brodie Lockard & Ivan Manley)
|Activision
|Board game
|-
|Shanghai II: Dragon's Eye
|
|John Wrenholt & Steve Luellman
|Big Red Computer Club
|Board game
|-
|Silent Service
|
|Ed Magnin
|Microprose
|Simulation
|-
|Silpheed
|
|Game Arts
|Sierra
|Action/arcade
|-
|Sinbad and the Throne of the Falcon
|
|Jim Simmons & Andrew Caldwell
|Cinemaware
|
|-
|Skate or Die!
|
|David Bunch, Michael Kosaka & Michelle Shelfer
|Electronic Arts
|
|-
|Solarian
|
|David Tolson
|
|Shoot-em-up
|-
|Solitaire & Cribbage
|
|
|Computrek Software
|Card game
|-
|Solitaire Royale
|
|Jake Hoelter, Jody Sather & Brad Fregger
|Spectrum Holobyte
|Card game
|-
|Son of Star Axe
|
|Jay Jennings & Jerry Jones
|Softdisk Publishing
|Shoot-em-up
|-
|Space Ace
|
|David Foster & Simon Douglas
|Ready Soft
|Arcade
|-
|Space Ace (re-issue)
|
|Antoine Vignau & Olivier Zardini (Brutal Deluxe)
|
|Arcade
|-
|Space Ace II: Borf's Revenge
|
|Antoine Vignau & Olivier Zardini (Brutal Deluxe)
|
|Arcade
|-
|Space Cluster
|
|Pascal Watel, Olivier Philipp & Claude Pélisson (Miami Software)
|
|Shoot-em-up
|-
|Space Quest I: The Sarien Encounter
|
|Scott Murphy & Mark Crowe
|Sierra
|Adventure
|-
|Space Quest II: Vohaul's Revenge
|
|Scott Murphy & Mark Crowe
|Sierra
|Adventure
|-
|Space Shark
|
|Miami Software
|Toolbox
|Shoot-em-up
|-
|Spacefox
|
|Bright Software (Joerg Kienzle & Yann Le Tensorer)
|Toolbox & Seven Hills Software
|Arcade
|-
|Spirit of Excalibur
|
|Synergistic Software
|Virgin Mastertronic
|RPG
|-
|Spy Hunter
|
|Shane Richards
|
|Arcade
|-
|Stalactites
|
|Rebecca Heineman
|Software Gremlins
|Action
|-
|Star Saga One: Beyond the Boundary
|
|Richard Dutton, Walter Freitag, Andrew Greenberg & Michael Massimilla
|Master Play
|RPG
|-
|Star Saga: Two - The Clathran Menace
|
|Richard Dutton, Walter Freitag, Andrew and Sheila Greenberg, Michael Massimilla & Gerald Seixas
|Master Play
|RPG
|-
|Star Trek Classic
|
|Joe Jaworski
|
|Real-time strategy
|-
|Street Sports Soccer
|
|Designer Software
|Epyx
|Sports
|-
|Strip Poker II
|
|Roger Harnish
|Artworx
|Gambling
|-
|Sub Battle Simulator
|
|Rob Brannon & Kelly Fergason
|Epyx
|Simulation
|-
|SubVersion
|
|Al Griest & Jason Harper
|Point of View Computing
|Turn-based strategy
|-
|Superstar Ice Hockey
|
|DesignStar Consultants (Andrew Caldwell)
|Mindscape
|Sports
|-
|Tarot
|
|François Uhrich & Jean-François Sauvage
|Toolbox
|Card game
|-
|Task Force
|
|Visual Concepts (Scott Patterson & Matt Crysdale)
|Britannica / Fanfare
|Arcade
|-
|Tass Times in Tonetown
|
|Rebecca Heineman (Interplay Productions & Brainwave Creations)
|Activision
|Adventure
|-
|Test Drive II: The Duel
|
|Distinctive Software Inc
|Accolade
|Racing
|-
|Tetris
|
|Roland Gustafsson, Sean Barger & Dan Geisler
|Spectrum Holobyte
|Puzzle/arcade
|-
|Tetrotrix
|
|Pierre Abel
|
|Puzzle/arcade
|-
|Thexder
|
|Game Arts
|Sierra
|Action/arcade
|-
|Third Courier, The
|
|Manley & Associates
|Accolade
|Adventure/RPG
|-
|Three Stooges, The
|
|Ed Magnin
|Cinemaware
|
|-
|Tinies, The
|
|Antoine Vignau & Olivier Zardini (Brutal Deluxe)
|
|Puzzle
|-
|Tomahawk
|
|John Brooks
|Datasoft
|Flight simulator
|-
|Tower of Myraglen
|
|Richard Seaborne & Jeff Lefferts
|PBI Software
|Action/RPG
|-
|Transylvania III
|
|Antonio Antiochia & Veronika Slintak
|Polarware
|Adventure
|-
|Triango
|
|Logical Design Works
|California Dreams
|Board game
|-
|Tunnels of Armageddon
|
|Logical Design Works
|California Dreams
|Action
|-
|Ultima I: The First Age of Darkness
|
|Rebecca Heineman
|Vitesse
|RPG
|-
|Uninvited
|
|ICOM Simulations
|Mindscape
|Adventure
|-
|Vegas Craps
|
|Logical Design Works
|California Dreams
|Gambling
|-
|Vegas Gambler
|
|Logical Design Works
|California Dreams
|Gambling
|-
|VIAD
|
|Kenrick Mock & James Brookes (Sound Barrier Systems)
|
|Arcade/puzzle
|-
|War in Middle Earth
|
|Synergistic Software
|Melbourne House
|Real-time strategy
|-
|Warlock
|
|ERE Informatique
|Three Sixty
|Action
|-
|Wheel of Fortune
|
|Edward Rambeau
|
|Trivia/puzzle
|-
|Where in the World is Carmen Sandiego?
|
|Loring Vogel
|Broderbund 
|Educational
|-
|Where in the USA is Carmen Sandiego?
|
|Sculptured Software (Peter Adams)
|Broderbund 
|Educational
|-
|Windwalker
|
|Greg Malone
|Origin
|RPG
|-
|Winter Games
|
|Westwood & IT
|Epyx
|Sports
|-
|Wolfenstein 3D
|
|Rebecca Heineman, Eric Shepherd & NinjaForce
|Logicware
|First-person shooter
|-
|World Games
|
|Westwood & IT
|Epyx
|Sports
|-
|World Tour Golf
|
|John Selhorst & Tanager Software Productions
|Electronic Arts
|Sports
|-
|Xenocide
|
|Pangea Software
|Micro Revelations
|Action/arcade
|-
|Zany Golf
|
|Sandcastle (Will Harvey, Ian Nitchal & Doug Fulton)
|Electronic Arts
|Sports/arcade
|-
|Zappa Roidz
|
|Ideas From the Deep (Lane Roath & John Romero)
|Softdisk Publishing
|Shoot-em-up
|}

Unreleased games

This category is of games that were never officially released, though some of which were leaked into the public. While playable, a number of these titles are in an unfinished state: missing key features, completed levels or stability.

There are currently ''' unfinished games on this list. This number is always up to date by this script.

See also
 List of Apple II games
 Lists of video games

References

External links
What is the Apple IIGS?
MobyGames' list of Apple II games
The Giant List of Classic Game Programmers

Video game lists by platform